Seeman is a 1994 Indian Tamil-language film, written and directed by Raj Kapoor. The film stars Karthik and Sukanya. It was released on 15 April 1994.

Plot

Cast 

Karthik as Collector Chandru I. A. S
Sukanya as Bhagyam
Jai Ganesh as Church Father
Kavitha as Abirami
Goundamani as Dawali
Senthil
Salim Ghouse as Masanam
Manorama
Silk Smitha
Sindhu
Vadivukkarasi
Vagai Chandrasekhar
Thalapathy Dinesh
Thyagu
Udayprakash as Mani
Shanmugasundari

Soundtrack 
The music was composed by Ilaiyaraaja, with lyrics by Vaali.

Reception 
The Indian Express gave a negative review citing "Raj Kapoor [..] has not done justice to the talented artiste Karthik". R. P. R. of Kalki wrote no matter which donkey the story goes on till the interval; then there is a little suspense, and then there are seven to eight fights to give it a happy end, which almost becomes the whole formula of this series, he panned Ilaiyaraaja's music and praised cinematography as the only positive point.

References

External links 
 

1990s Tamil-language films
1994 films
Films directed by Raj Kapoor (Tamil film director)
Films scored by Ilaiyaraaja